The men's shot put at the 1950 European Athletics Championships was held in Brussels, Belgium, at Heysel Stadium on 25 August 1950.

Medalists

Results

Final
25 August

Qualification
25 August

Participation
According to an unofficial count, 13 athletes from 11 countries participated in the event.

 (2)
 (1)
 (1)
 (1)
 (1)
 (1)
 (1)
 (1)
 (1)
 (2)
 (1)

References

Shot put
Shot put at the European Athletics Championships